Kostrzyn is a town in Greater Poland Voivodeship, Poland.

Kostrzyn may also refer to:

Gmina Kostrzyn, administrative district in Poznań County
Kostrzyn nad Odrą, town Lubusz Voivodeship, Poland